Just Another Town is an album by Irish folk singer Johnny Duhan, originally released 21 September 1992 in Ireland, re-released on CD on 31 March 2007.

Just Another Town is a portrait of the city Duhan grew up in. It sings of the people and location that formed him. Its melody and poetry come from the homes, bars, dancehalls, chapels, gardens, prisons, factories, and the very streets of the town it celebrates. It is not a nostalgic look back in blinkered pleasure. The landscape is urban, gritty and hard, and the characters are flawed and damaged. DH Lawrence once described towns as “scabs” on the face of the earth before he attempted to flee back to some primitive idyll. Modern cities are indeed scabs on the face of the world, but the way Johnny sees it, scabs are healing skin formations in the process of transforming damaged tissue back into healthy flesh. One of the greatest achievements of mankind, Duhan believes, is that we have learned to live in relative harmonious community in vast cities all over the world in a relatively short space of time. A spiritual dimension lies behind the ordering process that has brought about this transformation. Just Another Town attempts to illustrate some of the elements and forces that bound together the fragile community Duhan grew up with. It also shows how youthful innocence can act as a compass to guide us in doubting times.

Track listing
 "Another Morning"
 "Always Remember"
 "In the Garden"
 "Just Another Town"
 "Daredevil"
 "Let's Just Have Another Drink"
 "Benediction"
 "Mary"
 "Two Minds"
 "Stowaway"
 "This Time"
 "One Hundred Miles"
 "The River Shannon"
 "Margaret"
 "Young Mother"
 "Everything Will Be Alright"
 "A Winter's Night"

References

External links
 [ Allmusic]
 Amazon.com
 Homepage

2007 albums
Johnny Duhan albums